The Letter of Peter to Philip is a Gnostic writing. It was initially discovered as the second tractate in Codex VIII of the Nag Hammadi library. The tractate is a Coptic translation of a Greek original, likely written in c. 200 AD. An additional copy of the text, also written in Coptic, was later found in Codex Tchacos. The writing begins as an epistle from Peter to Philip the Apostle, but the narrative changes to a dialogue between Jesus and the disciples. The central message of the writing is to emphasize the soteriological value of preaching the message of Jesus.

Summary
Peter writes to Philip regarding orders from the savior to teach and preach about salvation. Peter is concerned that Philip is separated from the other messengers, but the letter persuades Philip to join them. The messengers gather on the mountain called Olivet, pray to God, and ask for strength as they fear being killed. A great light appears, and a voice reveals itself to be Jesus.

The messengers ask Jesus about the deficiency of the realms and their fullness, their detention in the dwelling place, and how they can leave and possess the authority of boldness. Jesus responds and explains that the deficiency of the aeons occurred when the disobedience and foolishness of the mother led to the establishment of eternal realms. The arrogant one followed her, took a portion, and sowed it, placing powers and authorities over it and confining it within the mortal realms. The arrogant one grew proud because of the praise of the powers and created mortal bodies from a misrepresentation of the appearance.

Jesus says that he was sent to Earth in the body for the sake of those who have fallen away, and that he spoke to one of his followers who recognized him and was given authority to enter the inheritance of his fatherhood. Jesus explains that those who are detained are his, and that they will become luminaries once they strip themselves of what is corruptible. He also explains that the powers fight against the inner person and that they must be fought against by teaching salvation in the world, arming oneself with his father's power, and expressing prayer. Lightning and thunder appear, and Jesus is taken up to heaven.

The messengers thank the Lord and return to Jerusalem. As they walk, they talk about the light that had appeared and their suffering. Peter reminds them that Jesus suffered for them, and they must also suffer. The messengers go to the temple, teach salvation in Jesus' name, and heal people. Peter speaks to his students and tells them that Jesus is the author of their life, and they should not listen to the lawless ones. He asks Jesus to give them a spirit of understanding and power to perform great deeds. The messengers are filled with the Holy Spirit, perform healings, and go to preach in the name of the Lord Jesus. Finally, Jesus appears and tells them that they will have joy, grace, and power, and he is with them forever.

Analysis
Although Peter's status in the writing may lead scholars to consider it a Petrine document, Michael Kaler argues that it is instead Pauline, since it draws on the account of Paul's revelation in Acts 9.

References

Peter to Philip
Petrine-related books
Texts in Coptic
2nd-century Christian texts
3rd-century Christian texts
Gnostic apocrypha
Nag Hammadi library